Shimulia Union, is a union parishad of the Jessore District in the Division of Khulna, Bangladesh. It has an area of 25.96 square kilometres and a population of 46,893.

Shimulia College is the only college in the union. There are three secondary schools: Mokamtala Secondary School, Saint Louis High School, and Shimulia S.M.P.K. High School.

References

Unions of Jhikargacha Upazila
Unions of Jessore District
Unions of Khulna Division